Sisseton typically refers to Sisseton, South Dakota.

Other uses include:

 Sisseton people, a group of Dakota people, a plains tribe
 Sisseton-Wahpeton Oyate, a federally recognized tribe of Santee Dakota in South Dakota
 Sisseton Wahpeton College, a tribal college in South Dakota
 Sisseton Lake, in Minnesota